Out of Season may refer to:

 Out of Season (Beth Gibbons and Rustin Man album), 2002
 Out of Season (Dave Rempis album), 2004
 Out of Season (film), a 1975 British film by Alan Bridges
 Out of Season (1998 film), a 1998 film directed by Jeanette L. Buck
 Out of Season (2004 film), a 2004 film directed by Jevon O'Neill, featuring Dennis Hopper
 "Out of Season" (short story), a 1993 story by Ernest Hemingway

See also
 Hunting season